The Lake of Death is a fantasy novel by Jean Rabe, set in the world of Dragonlance, and based on the Dungeons & Dragons role-playing game. It is the sixth novel in the "Age of Mortals" series. It was published in paperback in October 2004. It the story of Dhamon Grimwulf, the main antagonist from Dragons of a New Age and The Dhamon Saga.

Plot summary
The Lake of Death explores the lives of characters from The War of Souls trilogy, describing events that directly overlap the events of those stories.

Reception

References

2004 American novels

Dragonlance novels
The Age of Mortals series novels